Altoona Area High School (AAHS) is the public high school for the Altoona Area School District in Altoona, Pennsylvania. The high school serves the communities of Altoona, Logan Township, and a small portion of Tyrone Township.

The school district is the eighteenth largest in the state, and the high school is one of the largest and best known in the state. Altoona Area High School (AAHS) teaches grades 9 through 12.

History
The first six official graduates of Altoona Area High School graduated in 1877.

A riot occurred at the school in 1907 after boys in the senior class attempted to disrupt a junior class social. A large fight ensued and several students were injured after students threw stones and fired revolvers.

Another riot occurred at the school in 1910 after 25 senior students—on their last day of school—marched into the school's chapel service with their faces smeared. A large fight resulted, leading to the arrest of two students and suspension of 25 others.

In 1943, Altoona High became the only high school in the United States to have a World War II veteran as its class president. Robert G. Pennington, 18, had enlisted in 1942, and served four months in the Marine Corps before obtaining a medical discharge. He then returned to school.

Country music star and gay rights activist Chely Wright attended the school's 1998 prom, after accepting a request from student Dave Showalter that she be his date.

In 2002, school officials permitted an undercover female police officer to pose as a student for three months in order to identify drug transactions at the school. Five students were charged with drug violations.

Facility
The school was first located at the Webster Building, then became established in a separate building until 1895. In 1905, it moved to its present location on sixth avenue. This building cost $250,000. After the First World War, the building was not large enough to house the number of students it had enrolled. In 1927, a $1 million annex was added to accompany the facilities. A $14 million project during the 1970s allowed the school to be completely renovated and a 1200-seat auditorium was built. A new gym, called the fieldhouse, was also constructed. In 1995, the Women's Basketball Coaches Association High School All-America game was telecast live from the fieldhouse by ESPN2.

Building features
The school itself consists of two buildings (A and B) which contain a planetarium, full size gym, television studio, auxiliary gym, electronic learning laboratory, and regulation size swimming pool. An $88 million renovation of building A and a new B building was constructed across sixth avenue on the site of a former intramural playing field and running track. The new Building B is connected to Building A by a pedestrian bridge over Sixth Avenue. The new building opened in fall of 2021. The Vocational Technology Center is located adjacent to the high school.

Students and teachers

Number of students- 1962
Tenth grade- 688
Eleventh grade- 671
Twelfth grade- 439
Number of teachers- 118

William P. Kimmel Alternative School
The District offers this school for students who are not successful or are disruptive in the traditional public school setting. The school focuses on dropout prevention, improving student's reading and math skills and assisting the student to successfully graduate. The school was named for a former school board president.

Extracurriculars
The district offers a variety of clubs, activities and an extensive sports program. The district owns three fields with artificial turfs enhance physical education, intramural and interscholastic athletic opportunities.

Clubs and organizations
The school offers a wide variety of clubs and organizations that the students can join. These include Concert Chorus, Drama, one basic and one advanced Jazz Bands, An award-winning, nationally ranked Marching band, Orchestra, Pep band, Wind Ensemble, String Ensemble, Vocal Ensemble, Chorus, Auxiliary, Mountain Lion Television (MLTV), ETC (Et Cetera Literary Magazine), Horseshoe (Yearbook), Mt. Echo (Newspaper), Advanced Dance Class Club, Ambassador Club, Astronomy Club, Chess Club, The Circle of Friends (Support group), Computer Club, Class Organizations, Diversity Group, Earthkeepers, Foreign Language Club (now known as Fanatics for Language and Culture), Future Business Leaders of America (FBLA), Future Homemakers of America Club (FCCLA), General Interest Club, Girls' League, Homecoming Committee, Interact Club, Junior Academy of Science, Key Club, Lioneers (dance/drill team), Mock Trial Team, National Art Honor Society, National Honor Society (NHS), REACH (Support group), Peer Mediation Program, Performing Arts Club, Principal's Student Advisory Committee, Speech League, Student Council, Students Against Destructive Decisions (SADD), Scholastic Scrimmage Team, Sports Interest Club, Youth Education Association Club, and Youth and Government Club.

Athletics
There are numerous sports and athletic programs available to the students at Altoona Area High School including an Intramural sports program. The Football and Track and Field teams compete at historic Mansion Park, which recently underwent field replacement. The District also operates the Sheetz Athletic Training Center a 3600 square-foot facility opened in August, 2009.

Male sports
Baseball, Basketball, Cross Country, Football, Golf, Soccer, Swimming, Tennis, Track and Field, Volleyball, Winter Track, and Wrestling

Female sports
Basketball, Cheerleading, Cross Country, Golf,  Gymnastics, Soccer, Softball, Swimming, Tennis, Track and Field, Volleyball, and Winter Track.

State champions
The following Altoona High School teams won PIAA state championships in their respective sports.
1939 Boys' Cross Country
1941 Boys' Cross Country (tied with Mt. Lebanon)
1951 Boys' Cross Country
1954 Boys' Cross Country
1982 Girls' Cross Country
1983 Girls' Cross Country
1986 Girls' Basketball
1988 Girls' Basketball
1988 Girls' Cross Country
1995 Girls' Basketball
2008 Boys' Outdoor Track & Field
2009 Boys' Indoor Track & Field
2010 Boys' Indoor Track & Field
2010 Boys' Outdoor Track & Field

Notable alumni
 Brad Benson, former professional football player, New York Giants
 Rob Boston, author, advocate of church-state separatio.
 Blaine Earon, former professional football player, Detroit Lions
 Danny Fortson, former professional basketball player
 Richard Geist, former Pennsylvania House of Representatives member
 Kevin Givens, professional football player, San Francisco 49ers
 Mike Iuzzolino, former professional basketball player
 Betty James, businesswoman, wife of Slinky inventor Richard T. James
 Johnny Moore (basketball), professional basketball player for the San Antonio Spurs. Retired #00
 Maury Patt, deceased professional football player
 Mike Reid, songwriter, football player, Grammy Award winner
 Doug West, former professional basketball player, Minnesota Timberwolves and Vancouver Grizzlies
 Paul Winter musician, Grammy award nominee

References

External links
 History of the school
 Greatschools.net
 Public School Review

High schools in Central Pennsylvania
Buildings and structures in Altoona, Pennsylvania
Schools in Blair County, Pennsylvania
1895 establishments in Pennsylvania
Educational institutions established in 1895
Public high schools in Pennsylvania
Altoona, Pennsylvania